"Special Ones" is the debut single from Australian alternative rock group, George. It followed the release of three extended plays and was the first single taken from their debut studio album Polyserena (2002).

At the ARIA Music Awards of 2001, the song was nominated for 'Breakthrough Artist – Single', losing out to "Frontier Psychiatrist" by The Avalanches.

Track listing
 CD Single (020432) 
 "Special Ones" - 3:48
 "She Smiles" (Live) - 6:10
 "Under the Milky Way" (Live) - 4:34
 "Spawn"  (Future Funk Squad Bass Drop Remix)  - 6:30

 CD Rom (including the video for "Bastard Son")
 Tracks 2 & 3: Recorded live at The Healer, Brisbane, Australia 
 "Under The Milky Way" originally by The Church was covered by george for Triple J on 3 November 2000.

Weekly charts

Personnel
 Arranged By [Special Ones Horn Arrangement] – Katie Noonan
 Artwork, Design – Chris von Sanden
 Design [CD ROM Design] – Dimity Mapstone
 Engineer [Assistant] – Evan McHugh (tracks: 1), Justin Tresidder (tracks: 1)
 French Horn – Liza Willcock (tracks: 1), Olly Redfearn (tracks: 1)
 Performer [George], Bass [Basses] – Paulie B
 Performer [George], Drums – Geoff Green 
 Performer [George], Guitar [Guitars] – Nick Stewart
 Performer [George], Vocals [Vox], Keyboards [Keys] – Katie Noonan, Tyrone Noonan

References

George (band) songs
2001 songs
2001 debut singles